The Latvian Socialist Soviet Republic (LSPR) was a short-lived socialist republic formed during the Latvian War of Independence. It was proclaimed on 17 December 1918 with the political, economic, and military backing of Vladimir Lenin and his Bolshevik government in the Russian SFSR. The head of government was Pēteris Stučka with Jūlijs Daniševskis as his deputy.

History 
The LSPR armed forces, which consisted of the Red Latvian Riflemen and other units of the Red Army, quickly captured most of the territory of present-day Latvia, forcing Kārlis Ulmanis's provisional government into a small pocket of territory around the city of Liepāja.

Stučka's government introduced sweeping communist reforms, resuming the radical policy direction from the abortive Iskolat government. Some reforms were initially popular, such as the expropriation of property from the bourgeoisie. The decision to unilaterally nationalise all agrarian land, however, had dire economic consequences for the cities, as rural support for the regime declined drastically.

The peasants no longer agreed to supply the townsfolk with foodstuffs on the government's terms, and shortages became critical. When the people in Riga and other cities began to starve, contributing to widespread discontent among the proletariat as well, a wave of terror swept both rural and urban areas, seeking out alleged counter-revolutionaries supposedly responsible for the failures of the regime. Arbitrary Revolutionary Tribunals and the so-called Flintenweiber ("Gun-Women") were memorable components of this wave of terror.

When the Entente-backed Ulmanis government counter-attacked with the backing of German Freikorps units in the spring of 1919, they quickly regained the lost territory. The capital, Riga, was recaptured on 22 May 1919, and the territory of the LSPR was reduced to a part of Latgale in eastern Latvia, until the final defeat in the Battle of Daugavpils by combined Latvian and Polish forces in early 1920.

Historians in the USSR viewed the Soviet occupation of Latvia in 1940 as reestablishing of power, and the 1920–1940 period of Independence was viewed just as a temporary break in Soviet-Latvian history.

Government 
The formation of the Soviet Latvian government was initiated by the Central Committee of the Latvian Social Democracy (LSD) in Moscow on Joseph Stalin's proposal at an extraordinary meeting of the party's Russian bureau on November 23, 1918. Special meetings were created Latvian revolutionary composition of the provisional Soviet Government.

In 1919 The 1st Joint Congress of Workers', Landless and Riflemen's Councils was held in Riga on 1 January, announcing the establishment of the Latvian Socialist Soviet Republic, the establishment of a dictatorship of the proletariat, and electing the Latvian Central Executive Committee (LCIK) with 60 members and 20 candidates. LCIK appointed 11 members of the Soviet Latvian Government or Council of Commissars:

 Chiraman of the Council — Pēteris Stučka
 Deputy Chairman — Jūlijs Daniševskis, Jānis Lencmanis, Oto Kārkliņš
 People's Commissar of the Interior — Jānis Lencmanis
 Commissar of Justice — Pēteris Stučka
 Commissar of War — Kārlis Pētersons
 Commissar of Agriculture — Fricis Roziņš
Commissar of Finance —Rūdolfs Endrups
 Commissar of Industry — Dāvids Beika (Deputy Kārlis Pečaks)
 Secretary of the Council — Jānis Šilfs (Jaunzems)
 Commissar of Construction and Public Building — Eduards Zandreiters.
In April 1919, Kārlis Ziediņš, a member of the Revolutionary War Council of the Baltic Fleet, was appointed the head of the LSPR Maritime administration. Jānis Bērziņš (Ziemelis) was the Commissioner of Education and Augusts Sukuts was the Commissioner of State Control.  

All members of the government were also members of the LCIK presidium and the Central committee of the Latvian Social Democracy (later the Communist Party of Latvia). As a result, political power in Soviet Latvia was concentrated in the hands of a narrow circle of people. Eight economic commissions were merged into the Economic Council, while the war, home affairs and justice commissions were merged into the Revolutionary Struggle Council.

See also 
Latvian Soviet Socialist Republic
Iskolat
Commune of the Working People of Estonia
Finnish Socialist Workers' Republic
History of Latvia
Lithuanian–Byelorussian Soviet Socialist Republic
Republics of the Soviet Union
Socialist Soviet Republic of Byelorussia

References

Bibliography

External links 
Latvia in the Soviet Union (early flags)
Latvia at www.worldstatesmen.org.
 Significant documents from the history of the LSPR at historia.lv.

 
Political history of Latvia
1918 establishments in Latvia
Early Soviet republics
Russian-speaking countries and territories
States and territories established in 1918
1920 disestablishments
Former countries of the interwar period
Former socialist republics